The 2015 LINAFOOT was the inaugural season of the LINAFOOT, the top Chadian league for association football clubs. The season was supposed to run from February to August, with teams playing 22 matches each (playing each team in the league twice, home and away) totalling 132 matches in the season. However, due financial difficulties, championship was interrupted after 15 rounds and later resumed, finishing on 24 December 2015.

Gazelle won their third title. The defending champions were Foullah Edifice who finished in 4th position.

Events

From season 2015, national league system went through many changes. LINAFOOT started operating the league. The new system of 12 clubs from all over the country was introduced as well. Clubs that played in the first division were: AS Lycod Doba, AS Mirim Mongo, AS Wadi Fira, ASCOT Moundou, AS CotonTchad, Elect-Sport FC, FC Kebbi, Foullah Edifice FC, Gazelle FC, Renaissance FC, Renaissance FC (Abéché), AS Kokaga. The matches were usually being played at 15:30h or 16:00h local time. Gazelle FC won the championship. This edition of LINAFOOT was marked by many controversies, which led to proclaiming AS CotonTchad league champion, and then later giving Gazelle FC champion title back.
Following a controversy over a Gazelle player with contracts with two clubs, the Chadian Football Federation after their championship win decided to inscribe ASCOT and Renaissance FC into the African club competition, thus Gazelle did not appear in the 2016 CAF Champions League.

Teams

The participating teams were:

AS Lycod Doba
AS Mirim Mongo
AS Wadi Fira
ASCOT Moundou
AS CotonTchad
Elect-Sport FC
FC Kebbi
Foullah Edifice FC
Gazelle FC
Renaissance FC
Renaissance FC (Abéché)
AS Kokaga

Managers

League table

References 

Chad
Chad
Foo
Football leagues in Chad